Treyarch Corporation (formerly Treyarch Invention LLC) is an American video game developer based in Santa Monica, California. Founded in 1996 by Peter Akemann and Doğan Köslü, it was acquired by Activision in 2001. The studio is known for its work for the Call of Duty series, which it develops alongside Infinity Ward, Sledgehammer Games, and Raven Software.

History
Treyarch was founded in 1996 as Treyarch Inventions and was acquired by Activision in 2001. In 2005, Gray Matter Studios was merged into Treyarch.

As part of the 2007 Leipzig Games Convention, Activision announced that Treyarch would be one of three developers behind their first James Bond based game, 007: Quantum of Solace. The game was released on October 31, 2008 in Europe and November 4, 2008 in North America. Vicarious Visions developed the Nintendo DS version and Eurocom developed the PlayStation 2 version. Treyarch is a major developer in the Call of Duty series.

Call of Duty: Black Ops II held the record for the largest entertainment launch in history in any form of entertainment, breaking the record within 24 hours of its release until it was surpassed by Grand Theft Auto V. Sales from the game worldwide reached US$650 million within five days after its release. Treyarch worked on the Wii U version of Call of Duty: Ghosts, in order to optimize it for the console. Treyarch's latest video game is Call of Duty: Modern Warfare II, which was developed with Infinity Ward. The game was released on October 28, 2022.

Dan Bunting, who had been co-lead of Treyarch since around 2003, was named in an investigative report by The Wall Street Journal related to the lawsuit filed against Activision Blizzard by the state of California over workplace misconduct and discrimination. Bunting had reportedly mistreated an employee in 2017, but was kept on by Activision Blizzard's CEO, Bobby Kotick. After The Wall Street Journal began their investigation, Bunting was let go.

Games developed

Ports

References

External links
 
 Treyarch's profile at MobyGames
 Treyarch's Work at CallofDutyMaps

Activision
Companies based in Santa Monica, California
American companies established in 1996
Video game companies established in 1996
1996 establishments in California
Former Vivendi subsidiaries
Video game companies based in California
Video game development companies
2001 mergers and acquisitions